The Mossoviet (Russian: Моссовет), an abbreviation of Moscow Soviet (Московский Совет, Moskovskij Sovet), was established following the February Revolution . Initially it was a parallel, shadow city administration of Moscow, Russia run by left-wing parties. Following the October Revolution it became the city administration of Moscow throughout the Soviet period (1918–1991).

Initial period
The first meeting of the Moscow Soviet of Workers’ Deputies occurred on 1 March, 1917. The meeting was initially attended by 52 delegates from various factories, cooperative societies and trade unions. However when the meeting was reconvened in the evening after a short adjournment, the meeting had swollen to over six hundred delegates. An executive committee of 44 members was created under the leadership of Lev Khinchuk a member of the Menshevik faction of the Russian Social Democratic Labour Party.

After the Bolshevik seizure of power

Between 1918 and 1941, these two administrations were perceived as two distinct, although related, bodies. The Mossovet (Imeni Mossoveta) title was appended to the names of different institutions as an honorary title ("in the name of Mossovet") referring to 1917 events, i.e.
Mossovet Theater (established 1924, and still operates under this name)

or as a sign of administrative control ("established by Mossovet") by the current administration, i.e.
Mossovet Architectural Workshops (established 1932)
Mossovet Kindergarten could mean a corporate kindergarten for City Hall staff, or any public kindergarten managed by the City

Designed in 1780s by Matvey Kazakov, it was shorn off its wings in 1939 and moved fourteen meters backward on rollers.  By 1945 it was jacked up a storey, joined to a smaller house built in 1930s, sandwiched between new ground and attic floors, and fitted with a high-arched portico.

References

1917 establishments in Russia
1993 disestablishments in Russia
20th century in Moscow
 
Legislatures of the Soviet Union
Russian Revolution
Russian Soviet Federative Socialist Republic